James Chung Gon, (23 July 185423 February 1952) was a prominent Chinese Australian storekeeper, tin miner, market gardener, and Baptist lay preacher in Launceston, Tasmania, Australia, who became the leader of the Tasmanian Chinese community by the time of his death at 97, and was instrumental in organising the removal of the Weldborough joss house to the Victoria Museum in Launceston in the 1930s.

His funeral procession in 1952 was observed by hundreds of mourners lining the road, and his pallbearers included a Tasmanian Government Minister and the Mayor of Launceston.

References

External links 

1854 births
1952 deaths
Australian people of Chinese descent
People from Launceston, Tasmania
Chinese emigrants to Australia
Cantonese merchants
19th-century Chinese businesspeople